John Lawson Shute   (31 January 1901 – 23 November 1988) was a rugby union player who represented Australia.

Shute, a wing, was born near Sydney and claimed a total of 3 international rugby caps for Australia.

He was later chairman of the Australian Meat Board. He was appointed an Officer of the Order of the British Empire (OBE) in the 1959 Birthday Honours and a Companion of the Order of St Michael and St George (CMG) in the 1970 New Year Honours, for public services.

References

Australian rugby union players
Australia international rugby union players
1901 births
1988 deaths
People from Mudgee
Rugby union players from Sydney
Australian Officers of the Order of the British Empire
Australian Companions of the Order of St Michael and St George
Rugby union wings